The Indian Card Clothing Company Ltd. (abbreviated as ICC) is a Bombay Stock Exchange and National Stock Exchange listed company headquartered in Pune, India. Founded in 1955, ICC is a precision engineering company that manufactures and supplies card clothing products and carding solutions for the textile industry.

History 
It was incorporated on 24 June 1955 as a private company and in 1975 was converted to a public listed company jointly promoted by Carclo Engineering and English Card Clothing. In 1985, English Card Clothing (100% subsidiary of Carclo Engineering) sold its 57% stake in ICC to the new management.

Currently, Mauritius based Multi-Act Industrial Enterprises Limited is the holding company with 57.35% equity in the organization.

ICC also holds a 100% equity in UK-based Garnett Wires that manufactures card clothing for the non-woven segment.

Products 
ICC manufactures and supplies carding solutions for the textile industry.

Facilities 
The Indian Card Clothing manufacturing facilities are in Pune, Maharashtra and Nalagarh, Himachal Pradesh.

Locations 
The company has offices in India and overseas.

References 

Engineering companies of India
Indian companies established in 1955
Manufacturing companies based in Mumbai
Manufacturing companies based in Pune
Manufacturing companies established in 1955
1955 establishments in Bombay State